Loke pri Zagorju is a settlement immediately north of Kisovec in the Municipality of Zagorje ob Savi in central Slovenia. The area is part of the traditional region of Upper Carniola. It is now included with the rest of the municipality in the Central Sava Statistical Region.

Name
The name of the settlement was changed from Loke to Loke pri Zagorju in 1955.

References

External links
Loke pri Zagorju on Geopedia

Populated places in the Municipality of Zagorje ob Savi